Tipaza Longwave Transmitter is a Broadcast transmitter of Algeria's Entreprise nationale de Radiodiffusion sonore. It broadcasts the French-speaking station Alger Chaîne 3 on the longwave frequency of 252 kHz. Tipaza Longwave Transmitter, which is situated near Tipaza at 36°33'58" N and 2°28'50" E, has a transmission power of 1500 kW during the day and 750 kW at night. Tipaza Longwave Transmitter antenna is a 355-meter tall guyed mast, which is the second-tallest structure of Algeria.

External links  
 http://www.sia-enna.dz/PDF/AIP/ENR/ENR5/ENR5.4.pdf
 http://en.structurae.de/structures/data/index.cfm?id=s0038754

Buildings and structures in Algeria
Broadcast transmitters
Buildings and structures in Tipaza Province